This is a list of airlines that were active in Yugoslavia.

Yugoslavia was a country that existed between 1918 and 1992 (this article excludes data of the FR Yugoslavia that existed between 1992 and 2003 when it was renamed to Serbia and Montenegro). Created at the end of First World War in 1918 when Kingdom of Serbia absorbed South-Slav inhabited territories of Austro-Hungary, Yugoslavia existed as a monarchy until the start of Second World War, which for Yugoslavia was in 1941. In 1927 the first airline was created, Aeroput, which became the flag carrier and the 10th airline company founded in Europe and the 21st in the world. It operated all domestic and international flights to Central and South-Eastern Europe.

In 1945, at the end of Second World War, the monarchy was abolished and a communist regime came to power. In 1948, after Tito-Stalin split, Yugoslavia exited Eastern bloc, and, initiated a policy of world neutrality which later materialised in Yugoslavia becoming one of the founders and a leading force of the Non-Aligned Movement. This made Yugoslavia to be open and have access to both, Western and Eastern markets. Yugoslav companies operated both and also domestic-built aircraft, and were for decades the only ones from communist countries to operate Western-built aircraft. In 1947, Aeroput was reactivated and renamed to JAT Yugoslav Airlines becoming the flag carrier. Until early 1990s, JAT operated destinations to Europe, Asia, Australia, Africa and North America. In the 1970s more companies were created, mostly for charter flights, namely Belgrade-based Aviogenex, Ljubljana-based Adria Airways (known until 1988 as Inex-Adria), and Zagreb-based Pan Adria (renamed in 1978 to Trans Adria).

The late 1980s and early 1990s saw a boom of creation of regional companies, some of them later becoming the flag carriers of the newly formed countries after the dissolution of Yugoslavia in 1992. However, the entire airline industry, which was well developed and in continuous expansion, suffered a huge setback in the 1990s with the Yugoslav Wars and UN imposed sanctions.

See also
 List of airlines of Bosnia and Herzegovina
 List of defunct airlines of Bosnia and Herzegovina
 List of airlines of Croatia
 List of defunct airlines of Croatia
 List of airlines of Kosovo
 List of defunct airlines of Kosovo
 List of airlines of North Macedonia
 List of defunct airlines of North Macedonia
 List of airlines of Montenegro
 List of airlines of Serbia
 List of defunct airlines of Serbia
 List of airlines of Slovenia
 List of defunct airlines of Slovenia

References

Yugoslavia
Yugoslavia
Airlines
Airlines